Fabio Augusto Luciano da Silva (born 18 November 1999), commonly known as Fabinho, is a Brazilian footballer who plays as a forward for CRB on loan from Athletico Paranaense.

Career statistics

Club

References

External links
Chapecoense official profile 

1999 births
Living people
People from São José dos Campos
Brazilian footballers
Association football forwards
Campeonato Brasileiro Série A players
São Paulo FC players
Club Athletico Paranaense players
Associação Chapecoense de Futebol players
Esporte Clube Vitória players
Mirassol Futebol Clube players
Footballers from São Paulo (state)